Paraschistura lepidocaulis is a species of stone loach that is endemic to Pakistan.

Footnotes 

lepidocaulis
Freshwater fish of Pakistan
Endemic fauna of Pakistan
Fish described in 1981
Taxa named by Teodor T. Nalbant